The 2015–16 East Midlands Counties Football League season was the 8th in the history of East Midlands Counties Football League, a football competition in England.

League

The league featured 19 clubs from the previous season, along with one new club:
Mickleover Royals, promoted from the Central Midlands Football League

League table

References

External links
 East Midlands Counties Football League official site

2015–16
10